The Isotta Fraschini V.6 was an Italian six-cylinder, water-cooled, in-line piston aero engine of the late World War I period, the "V" denoted "Volo" or "flight".  Its construction was fairly typical of contemporary aircraft engines, using six cast-iron cylinders mounted in pairs with common heads.

Variants
V.6
V.6bis

Applications
CANT 18
Caproni Ca.4
Caproni Ca.5
Caproni Ca.61
Macchi M.5
Macchi M.7
Piaggio P.6
Savoia-Marchetti S.57
SIAI S.13
SIAI S.22

Specifications (V.6)

See also

References

Notes

Bibliography

Gunston, Bill. World Encyclopedia of Aero Engines. Cambridge, England. Patrick Stephens Limited, 1989. 
 

V.6
1910s aircraft piston engines